Thomas Mainwaring Penson (1818–64) was an English surveyor and architect.  He was born in Oswestry, Shropshire, the son of Thomas Penson, also a surveyor and architect, and was educated at Oswestry School.  He and his brother, Richard Kyrke Penson, then trained in their father's practice.  He designed buildings in the area of the practice, including stations for the Shrewsbury and Chester Railway.  He was appointed as county surveyor of Cheshire and moved to Chester, Cheshire.  Here he laid out Overleigh Cemetery in 1848–50.  This has been designated at Grade II in the National Register of Historic Parks and Gardens.  He is credited with pioneering the Black-and-white Revival (vernacular or half-timbered) style in the city during the 1850s.  His first building in this style was constructed in Eastgate Street in 1852, but it has since been demolished.

Key

Works

References

Bibliography

Tudor Revival architecture
 
Lists of buildings and structures by architect
Gothic Revival architecture